Karaşeyh is a village in the Adilcevaz District of Bitlis Province in Turkey. Its population is 351 (2021).

References

Villages in Adilcevaz District